Shara Nova (previously Worden) is the lead singer and songwriter for My Brightest Diamond. As a composer she is most recognized for her choral compositions and the baroque chamber opera "You Us We All".  New music composers Sarah Kirkland Snider, David Lang, Steve Mackey and Bryce Dessner have composed pieces for Nova's voice.  She has recorded as a guest vocalist with David Byrne, Laurie Anderson, The Decemberists, Sufjan Stevens, Jedi Mind Tricks, The Blind Boys of Alabama and Stateless as well as extensive collaborations with visual artists Matthew Ritchie and Matthew Barney.  She was formerly the frontwoman of AwRY. On March 3, 2016, Shara legally changed her last name from Worden to Nova after divorcing her husband, to whom she had been married most of her adult life.

Life
Nova was born in El Dorado, Arkansas. Her father was an accordion player and choir director and her mother was an organist for their Pentecostal church.
Nova's uncle Donald Ryan, a classical and jazz pianist and arranger, taught her piano lessons as a child. Nova's family moved to many different states when she was a child, including significant time in Sapulpa, Oklahoma, and Ypsilanti, Michigan.

Nova graduated from the University of North Texas with a BA in vocal performance. After college, she lived in Moscow, Russia, for a year where she studied Russian and wrote songs, producing a self-released, limited edition EP, Session I. She moved to New York City, where she continued to study opera with Josephine Mongiardo. In 2009 Nova moved to Detroit, Michigan.

She married in 1997 and divorced in 2016, legally changing her name from Worden (her ex-husband's surname) to Nova. With her ex-husband she has one child, Constantine Jamesson Worden, born in 2010.

Career
In 2001, Nova self-released two albums in collaboration with guitarist Shane Yarbrough under the moniker Awry, The Orange Album and Quiet B Sides. A short tour followed the release of the albums, after which the band dissolved. In 2002 and 2003, Nova wrote music for Adam Rapp's play Trueblinka (directed by Simon Hammerstein) and subsequently for Hammerstein's production of Jean-Paul Sartre's Men Without Shadows (Morts sans sépulture). She began studying composition with Padma Newsome during this time. Then in 2004 she began touring in Sufjan Stevens' band to support his album "Michigan". In 2006, she released the album "Bring Me The Workhorse" on Asthmatic Kitty Records under the moniker My Brightest Diamond and was nominated for Female Artist of the Year in the PLUG Independent Music Awards. The My Brightest Diamond albums "A Thousand Shark's Teeth" (2008), "All Things Will Unwind" (2011), and "This Is My Hand" (2014) were also released on Asthmatic Kitty Records. Nova became a Kresge performing arts fellow in 2012.

Collaborations
She made a guest appearance on the Jedi Mind Tricks album Servants in Heaven, Kings in Hell in 2006 and on the Vinnie Paz album Season of the Assassin in 2010. In 2008 Nova sang as a background vocalist for Laurie Anderson during five performances at The Rose Theater for the show Homeland. She performed guest vocals on "The Wanting Comes in Waves/Repaid" and "The Queen's Rebuke/The Crossing" from the 2009 album by The Decemberists, The Hazards of Love, singing vocals for the part of "The Queen". She also performed with The Decemberists on their "A Short Fazed Hovel Tour" along with Becky Stark from Lavender Diamond. She performed vocals on Sufjan Stevens' album The Age of Adz, notably taking the lead during a section of "Impossible Soul". Nova performed in and wrote the song "Nine" for Bryce and Aaron Dessner's multi-media performance The Long Count with texts and images by Matthew Ritchie. The Long Count was performed at the Krannert Center (2009), BAM (2009), the Holland Festival (2012) and the Barbican Centre (2012). In January 2012 Nova performed the premiere of the song cycle Death Speaks by David Lang with pianist Nico Muhly, violinist Owen Pallett and guitarist Bryce Dessner. In 2015, Nova provided vocals for Sarah Kirkland Snider's Unremembered, and debuted her opera (co-written with Andrew Ondrejcak), You Us We All,  in the United States.

Compositions

 Letters from Charles: for yMusic. Performed at the 92nd Street Y in Tribeca. Performed March 2010.
 A Paper, A Pen, A Note to a Friend: for yMusic. Released on Beautiful Mechanical (New Amsterdam Records 2011).
 A Whistle, A Tune, A Macaroon: for yMusic. Released on Beautiful Mechanical (New Amsterdam Records 2011).
 Skin and Bones: for yMusic
 From the Invisible to the Visible: for organist James McVinnie and violist Nadia Sirota commissioned by MusicNOW festival in March 2012. Released on the album Baroque (Bedroom Community 2013)
 The Pyramid Songs : 3 songs for The Brooklyn Youth Chorus, first performed by the choir at Crossing Borders Festival at BAM in New York, May 2012.
 Kings of Macedonia: music for brass quartet, drums and choir for Andrew Ondrejcak's play Kings of Macedonia. She also performed in the play as the character The Whore in May 2012 at The Kitchen.
 Phase 1 & III: music for marching band. Performed by The Detroit Party Marching Band (2013) for the opening ceremonies of Art X. Funded by The Kresge Foundation.
 The Pleiades: 5 songs for the Young New Yorkers' Chorus. Commissioned 2013.
 YOU, US, WE, ALL: Nova composed the music for a baroque opera designed and directed by Andrew Ondrejcak; performed in Antwerp, Belgium, May 2013.

Discography

Solo albums

Collaborations and guest appearances

Credited as Shara Worden

Significant album contributions

Individual songs

With AwRY

With My Brightest Diamond

Collaborations and compilation contributions

References

External links
Thelmagazine.com
Asthmatickitty.com
Pacificlectic.com

American women composers
21st-century American composers
American women pianists
Living people
University of North Texas College of Music alumni
1974 births
People from Ypsilanti, Michigan
Singers from Michigan
20th-century American composers
20th-century American women guitarists
20th-century American guitarists
21st-century American women guitarists
21st-century American guitarists
Guitarists from Michigan
20th-century American women singers
My Brightest Diamond members
21st-century American women singers
21st-century American pianists
20th-century women composers
21st-century women composers
20th-century American singers
21st-century American singers